Terri Goodknight is an American Paralympic athlete and wheelchair basketball player. She won a gold medal at the 1988 Summer Paralympics.

Life 
She graduated from Urbana High School, and University of Illinois Urbana-Champaign.

Career 
At the 1992 Summer Paralympics, she competed in Women's 200 meters TW3, Women's 400 meters TW3, and Women's 100 meters TW3 finishing tenth.

At the 1998 Summer Paralympics, in Seoul, she competed in Wheelchair Basketball, winning a gold medal.

References 

Living people
Paralympic wheelchair basketball players of the United States
Paralympic track and field athletes of the United States
American female wheelchair racers
Athletes (track and field) at the 1992 Summer Paralympics
Wheelchair basketball players at the 1988 Summer Paralympics
Medalists at the 1988 Summer Paralympics
Paralympic gold medalists for the United States
University of Illinois Urbana-Champaign alumni
Year of birth missing (living people)